Expulsions in Sri Lankan Civil War may refer to

Expulsion of non-resident Tamils from Colombo
Expulsion of Muslims from the Northern province by LTTE